A list of films produced by the Tollywood (Bengali language film industry) based in Kolkata in the year 1994.

Highest-grossing
Rakta Nadir Dhara

A-Z of films

References

External links
 Tollywood films of 1994 at the Internet Movie Database

1994
Lists of 1994 films by country or language
1994 in Indian cinema
1994 films